Ixiamas Municipality is the first municipal section of the Abel Iturralde Province in the  La Paz Department, Bolivia. Its seat is Ixiamas.

References 

 Instituto Nacional de Estadistica de Bolivia

Municipalities of La Paz Department (Bolivia)